Früh or Frueh (German and Swiss German: from Middle High German vruo "early" applied as a nickname for an early riser or more likely used ironically for a sloth and sometimes for a child born before or very early in the marriage) is a German surname. Notable people with the surname include:
 Bartley Christopher Frueh (born 1963), American clinical psychologist and author
 Huldreich Georg Früh (1903–1945), Swiss composer
 Joanna Frueh (1948–2020), American artist, writer, and feminist scholar
 Johann Jakob Früh (1852–1938), Swiss geographer and geologist
 Oscar Früh (1891–1949), Swiss painter

German companies 
 Cölner Hofbräu Früh, private brewery for top-fermented beer called Kölsch
 Max Früh, German specialist construction company mostly building bridges

See also

Surnames of Swiss origin

German-language surnames
Surnames from nicknames
Swiss-German surnames